The 1950 Santa Clara Broncos football team was an American football team that represented Santa Clara University as an independent during the 1950 college football season. In their first season under head coach Richard F. Gallagher, the Broncos compiled a 3–7 record and were outscored by opponents by a combined total of 198 to 165.

Schedule

References

Santa Clara
Santa Clara Broncos football seasons
Santa Clara Broncos football